Roberto Álvarez Gil (born in Santo Domingo on June 7, 1944) is a Dominican lawyer, diplomat and politician. Since August 16, 2020, he is the Foreign Minister of the Dominican Republic, in the government of President Luis Abinader. He is also a researcher and author of publications on human rights and international relations. In 2005, he was Permanent Representative of the Dominican Republic to the Organization of American States.

References 

Living people
1944 births
People from Santo Domingo
Dominican Republic lawyers
Dominican Republic politicians
Government ministers of the Dominican Republic
Foreign ministers of the Dominican Republic